A list of churches in Iceland:

Múlaprófastsdæmi 
 Skeggjastaðakirkja 
 Hofskirkja 
 Vopnafjarðarkirkja 
 Valþjófsstaðarkirkja 
 Áskirkja 
 Hofteigskirkja 
 Eiríksstaðakirkja 
 Möðrudalskirkja
 Vallaneskirkja
 Þingmúlakirkja 
 Egilsstaðakirkja 
 Eiðakirkja 
 Hjaltastaðakirkja 
 Kirkjubæjarkirkja 
 Sleðbrjótskirkja 
 Bakkagerðiskirkja 
 Húsavíkurkirkja
 Seyðisfjarðarkirkja 
 Klyppstaðakirkja

Austfjarðaprófastsdæmi 
 Norðfjarðarkirkja 
 Mjóafjarðarkirkja 
 Eskifjarðarkirkja
 Eskifjarðarkirkja
 Reyðarfjarðarkirkja 
 Kolfreyjustaðarkirkja
 Fáskrúðsfjarðarkirkja 
 Búðakirkja
 Heydalakirkja 
 Stöðvarfjarðarkirkja 
 Stöðvarkirkja 
 Eydalakirkja
 Djúpavogskirkja
 Djúpavogskirkja
 Berufjarðarkirkja 
 Beruneskirkja 
 Hofskirkja 
 Bænhúsið í Papey

Skaftafellsprófastsdæmi 
 Bjarnarneskirkja 
 Hafnarkirkja 
 Stafafellskirkja
 Hoffellskirkja
 Kálfafellsstaðarkirkja 
 Hofskirkja 
 Brunnhólskirkja 
 Minningarkapella 
 Bænhúsið á Núpsstað
 Prestbakkakirkja 
 Kálfafellskirkja
 Þykkvabæjarkapella 
 Þykkvabæjarklausturskirkja 
 Langholtskirkja 
 Grafarkirkja 
 Skeiðflatarkirkja 
 Reyniskirkja 
 Víkurkirkja 
 Sólheimakapella

Rangárvallaprófastsdæmi 
 Eyvindarhólakirkja 
 Ásólfsskálakirkja
 Stóra-Dalskirkja 
 Krosskirkja 
 Akureyjarkirkja 
 Voðmúlastaðakapella
 Safnkirkjan í Skógum
 Hlíðarendakirkja 
 Breiðabólsstaðarkirkja 
 Stórólfshvolskirkja 
 Oddakirkja
 Kapella dvalarheimilisins Lundar á Hellu 
 Keldnakirkja 
 Þykkvabæjarkirkja 
 Skarðskirkja
 Marteinstungukirkja 
 Hagakirkja 
 Árbæjarkirkja 
 Kálfholtskirkja

Árnesprófastsdæmi 
 Eyrarbakkakirkja 
 Stokkseyrarkirkja 
 Gaulverjabæjarkirkja 
 Hrunakirkja
 Hrepphólakirkja 
 Tungufellskirkja 
 Hveragerðiskirkja
 Kapellan Náttúrulækningaheilsuhælinu 
 Kotstrandarkirkja 
 Þorlákskirkja 
 Hjallakirkja 
 Strandarkirkja
 Mosfellskirkja 
 Miðdalskirkja 
 Úthlíðarkirkja
 Stóruborgarkirkja 
 Búrfellskirkja 
 Sólheimakapella
 Úlfljótsvatnskirkja 
 Selfosskirkja  
 Hraungerðiskirkja
 Villingaholtskirkja 
 Laugardælakirkja 
 Skálholtskirkja
 Bræðratungukirkja 
 Haukadalskirkja
 Torfastaðakirkja 
 Stóra-Núpskirkja 
 Ólafsvallakirkja 
 Þingvallakirkja í Þingvallaprestakalli

Kjalarnesprófastsdæmi 
 Grindavíkurkirkja
 Grindavíkurkirkja
 Kirkjuvogskirkja 
 Útskálakirkja 
 Hvalsneskirkja 
 Keflavíkurkirkja
 Innri-Njarðvíkurkirkja 
 Ytri-Njarðvíkurkirkja 
 Hafnarfjarðarkirkja
 Krýsuvíkurkirkja
 Víðistaðakirkja

 Vídalínskirkja 
 Garðakirkja 
 Bessastaðakirkja 
 Kálfatjarnarkirkja 
 Mosfellskirkja
 Lágafellskirkja 
 Reynivallakirkja 
 Brautarholtskirkja 
 Saurbæjarkirkja
 Hallgrímskirkja í Vindáshlíð
 Landakirkja í Vestmannaeyjaprestakalli 
 Stafkirkja við Hringskersgarð

Reykjavíkurprófastsdæmin 
 Árbæjarkirkja í Árbæjarprestakalli
 Safnakirkjan í Árbæjarsafni
 Breiðholtskirkja 
 Digraneskirkja
 Fella- og Hólakirkja 
 Grafarvogskirkja
 Hjallakirkja
 Kópavogskirkja
 Seljakirkja 
 Fossvogskapella
 Áskirkja 
 Bústaðarkirkja 
 Dómkirkjan 
 Viðeyjarkirkja
 Grensáskirkja
 Hallgrímskirkja
 Háteigskirkja 
 Friðrikskapella
 Langholtskirkja
 Laugarneskirkja
 Neskirkja
 Seltjarnarneskirkja

Borgarfjarðarprófastsdæmi 
 Hallgrímskirkja 
 Leirárkirkja 
 Innra-Hólmskirkja 
 Kapellan í Vatnaskógi  
 Akraneskirkja 
 Hvanneyrarkirkja 
 Bæjarkirkja 
 Lundarkirkja 
 Fitjakirkja
 Reykholtskirkja 
 Reykholtskirkja
 Stóra-Áskirkja 
 Gilsbakkakirkja 
 Síðumúlakirkja 
 Húsafellskirkja  
 Stafholtskirkja
 Norðtungukirkja 
 Hvammskirkja 
 Hjarðarholtskirkja 
 Borgarkirkja
 Borgarneskirkja 
 Álftaneskirkja 
 Álftártungukirkja 
 Akrakirkja

Snæfellsness- og Dalaprófastsdæmi 
 Ingjaldshólskirkja
 Búðakirkja 
 Hellnakirkja 
 Staðarstaðarkirkja  
 Staðarhraunskirkja 
 Fáskrúðarbakkakirkja 
 Rauðamelskirkja
 Kolbeinsstaðakirkja 
 Miklaholtskirkja 
 Ólafsvíkurkirkja
 Brimilsvallakirkja
 Grundafjarðarkirkja 
 Setbergskirkja
 Stykkishólmskirkja 
 Stykkishólmskirkja 
 Helgafellskirkja 
 Bjarnarhafnarkirkja
 Narfeyrarkirkja 
 Breiðabólsstaðarkirkja 
 St. Fransiskukapellan
 Hjarðarholtskirkja 
 Kvennabrekkukirkja 
 Snóksdalskirkja 
 Stóra-Vatnshornskirkja 
 Hvammskirkja 
 Staðarfellskirkja 
 Dagverðarneskirkja 
 Skarðskirkja
 Staðarhólskirkja

Barðastrandarprófastsdæmi 
 Reykhólakirkja  
 Staðarkirkja 
 Garpdalskirkja 
 Gufudalskirkja 
 Múlakirkja 
 Flateyjarkirkja 
 Tálknafjarðarkirkja 
 Stóra-Laugardalskirkja
 Brjánslækjarkirkja 
 Hagakirkja 
 Patreksfjarðarkirkja
 Sjúkrahúskapellan Patreksfirði 
 Saurbæjarkirkja 
 Sauðlauksdalskirkja 
 Breiðavíkurkirkja 
 Bíldudalskirkja
 Selárdalskirkja
 Selárdalskirkja, Samúels
 Otradalskirkja

Ísafjarðarprófastsdæmi 
 Hrafnseyrarkirkja 
 Minningarkapella Jóns Sigurðssonar 
 Álftamýrarkirkja
 Þingeyrarkirkja 
 Tjarnarkapella 
 Hraunskirkja
 Mýrakirkja 
 Núpskirkja 
 Sæbólskirkja 
 Holtskirkja
 Kirkjubólskirkja 
 Flateyrarkirkja 
 Staðarkirkja 
 Suðureyrarkirkja 
 Hólskirkja 
 Staðarkirkja 
 Staðarkirkja 
 Bænhúsið í Furufirði
 Ísafjarðarkirkja 

 Sjúkrahúskapellan Ísafirði 
 Hnífsdalskapella 
 Súðavíkurkirkja 
 Eyrakirkja 
 Vatnsfjarðarkirkja 
 Nauteyrarkirkja
 Melgraseyrarkirkja
 Unaðsdalskirkja 
 Ögurkirkja

Húnavatnsprófastsdæmi 
 Árneskirkja 
 Árneskirkja
 Hólmavíkurkirkja 
 Staðarkirkja
 Drangsneskapella 
 Kaldrananeskirkja 
 Kollafjarðarneskirkja 
 Óspakseyrarkirkja 
 Prestbakkakirkja 
 Staðarkirkja 
 Melstaðarkirkja 
 Staðarbakkakirkja 
 Víðidalstungukirkja 
 Efranúpskirkja
 Hvammstangakirkja
 Sjúkrahúskapellan Hvammstanga 
 Kirkjuhvammskirkja 
 Tjarnarkirkja 
 Vesturhópshólakirkja 
 Breiðabólsstaðarkirkja 
 Þingeyraklausturskirkja 
 Blönduóskirkja 
 Blönduóskirkja
 Höskuldsstaðakirkja  
 Höfðakirkja
 Hofskirkja 
 Bergstaðakirkja 
 Auðkúlukirkja 
 Holtastaðakirkja 
 Bólstaðarhlíðarkirkja

Skagafjarðarprófastsdæmi 
 Sauðárkrókskirkja 
 Hvammskirkja
 Ketukirkja 
 Sjávarborgarkirkja
 Glaumbæjarkirkja 
 Víðimýrarkirkja 
 Reynistaðarkirkja 
 Mælifellskirkja 
 Reykjakirkja 
 Goðdalakirkja 
 Ábæjarkirkja
 Miklabæjarkirkja
 Silfrastaðakirkja 
 Flugumýrarkirkja 
 Hofsstaðakirkja 
 Hóladómkirkja 
 Viðvíkurkirkja 
 Rípurkirkja 
 Hofsósskirkja 
 Hofskirkja 
 Fellskirkja 
 Barðskirkja 
 Bænhúsið í Gröf
 Knappstaðakirkja
 Siglufjarðarkirkja

Eyjafjarðarprófastsdæmi 
 Ólafsfjarðarkirkja
 Kvíabekkjarkirkja
 Vallakirkja 
 Upsakapella Dalvík 
 Tjarnarkirkja
 Urðarkirkja 
 Dalvíkurkirkja 
 Hríseyjarkirkja 
 Stærra-Árskógskirkja 
 Möðruvallarkirkja 
 Glæsibæjarkirkja
 Bakkakirkja 
 Bægisárkirkja 
 Glerárkirkja 
 Lögmannshlíðarkirkja
 Akureyrarkirkja
 Miðgarðskirkja 
 Safnakirkjan
 Munkaþverárkirkja
 Kaupangskirkja 
 Grundarkirkja 
 Möðruvallarkirkja
 Saurbæjarkirkja
 Hólakirkja

Þingeyjarprófastsdæmi 
 Svalbarðskirkja í Laufásprestakalli 
 Laufáskirkja
 Grenivíkurkirkja 
 Hálskirkja í Ljósavatnsprestakalli 
 Þorgeirskirkja 
 Illugastaðakirkja
 Draflastaðakirkja 
 Ljósavatnskirkja
 Þóroddsstaðarkirkja 
 Lundarbrekkukirkja 
 Skútustaðakirkja 
 Reykjahlíðarkirkja 
 Víðirhólskirkja 
 Bænhúsið á Rönd
 Grenjaðarstaðarkirkja
 Þverárkirkja 
 Einarsstaðarkirkja 
 Neskirkja 
 Bænhúsið á Végeirsstöðum 
 Húsavíkurkirkja 
 Brettingsstaðakirkja
 Flateyjarkirkja á Skjálfanda
 Skinnastaðarkirkja
 Garðskirkja 
 Snartarstaðakirkja 
 Raufarhafnarkirkja
 Þórshafnarkirkja
 Sauðaneskirkja
 Svalbarðskirkja

Churches outside þjóðkirkju 
 Fríkirkjan í Hafnarfirði 
 Fríkirkjan í Reykjavík 
 Fíladelfía 
 Jósefskirkja 
 Kirkja Óháða safnaðarins 
 Landakotskirkja (Basilika Krists konungs) 
 Maríukirkja
 Hvítasunnukirkjan
 Aðventistasöfnuðurinn 
 Aðventistasöfnuðurinn á Ísafirði

 
Churches
Churches